Derik District is a district of Mardin Province in Turkey which has the town of Derik as its seat. The district had a population of 62,203 in 2021.

Creation 
According to the 2012 Metropolitan Municipalities Law (Law No. 6360), all Turkish provinces with a population more than 750,000 will become metropolitan municipalities and the districts within the metropolitan municipalities  will be second-level municipalities. The law also created new districts within the provinces in addition to current districts.

Settlements 
The district encompasses eighty neighborhoods of which six form the city of Derik.

Center neighborhoods 

 Bahçelievler
 Cevizpınar
 Dağ
 Kale
 Küçükpınar
 Zeytinpınar

Rural neighborhoods 

 Adak
 Adakent
 Ahmetli
 Akçay
 Akıncılar
 Alagöz
 Alanlı
 Alibey
 Ambarlı
 Aşağımezraa
 Atlı
 Aydınlar
 Bağarası
 Ballı
 Balova
 Başaran
 Bayırköy
 Bayraklı
 Beşbudak
 Boyaklı
 Bozbayır
 Bozok
 Böğrek
 Burçköy
 Çadırlı
 Çağıl
 Çataltepe
 Çayköy
 Çukursu
 Demirli
 Denktaş
 Derinsu
 Dikmen
 Doğancı
 Dumanlı
 Dumluca
 Düztaş
 Göktaş
 Gölbaşı
 Hayırlı
 Hisaraltı
 Ilıca
 Issız
 İncesu
 Kanatlı
 Karaburun
 Karataş
 Kayacık
 Kocatepe
 Koçyiğit
 Konak
 Konuk
 Kovalı
 Kovanlı
 Köseveli
 Kuruçay
 Kuşçu
 Kutluca
 Kuyulu
 Meşeli
 Ortaca
 Pınarcık
 Pirinçli
 Soğukkuyu
 Söğütözü
 Subaşı
 Şahverdi
 Şerefli
 Taşıt
 Tepebağ
 Üçkuyu
 Üçtepe
 Yazıcık
 Yukarımezraa

References 

Districts of Mardin Province